The Career Preparation Center is a high school located in Sterling Heights, Michigan and is part of the Warren Consolidated School District. It aims to prepare students for a career out of high school or for college.

Programs
Academic Integration
Administrative Office Specialist
Agriscience/Floral Design and Management
Agriscience/Landscaping
Auto Body
Building Trades
Child Development
Computer Aided Drafting (CAD)
Computer Aided Manufacturing (CAM)
Computer Information Systems (CIS)
Culinary Arts
Dental Careers
Electronic Services
Emergency Medical Technician-Basic (EMT-B)
Food Services
Graphic Design & Printing Technology
Legal Office Specialist
Medical Careers
Medical Manufacturing
Medical Office Specialist
Network Administration
Visual Arts
Watch & Clock Repair
Radio/TV - at Cousino High School

External links
Career Preparation Center

Public high schools in Michigan
Schools in Macomb County, Michigan
Sterling Heights, Michigan